Belushya Bay (Russian: Губа́ Белу́шья, lit. beluga whale bay) is a bay on Yuzhny Island in Novaya Zemlya, Russia.

The bay is located on the south-west coast of the island. The settlement Belushya Guba, of the same name, is situated on its shores.

External links 
 Испытание чистой водородной бомбы мощностью 50 млн тонн, Rosatom historical video of the RDS-220, or Tsar Bomba, 50 megatonne hydrogen bomb test north of the Belushya Bay technical headquarters and support services, in October 1961. at 8:55–9:12. 20 August 2020.

References

Novaya Zemlya
Bays of Russia